Lt. Colonel Townsend E. Griffiss (April 4, 1900 – February 15, 1942) was a United States Army Air Forces aviator, the first American airman killed in Europe following the United States' entry into World War II.

Early life
Griffiss was born in Buffalo, New York, to polo player Ellicott Evans and Katherine Hamlin, both from wealthy New York families. His mother later married  banker  and Townsend took his surname. Known to his family as "Tim," he was raised in Coronado, California, an affluent coastal suburb of San Diego.

Professional career
Griffiss graduated from the United States Military Academy at West Point in 1922, and joined the U.S. Army Air Corps. He trained as a fighter pilot in Texas, then served in Hawaii from 1925 to 1928.  His family's wealth allowed him to rent a house on Waikiki Beach, and there he wrote a guidebook, When You Go to Hawaii You Will Need This Guide to the Islands, which was published in 1930. He shared his birth-father's passion for polo, and joined the military team based in Hawaii, led by Major George S. Patton.

After operational postings in California and Texas, Griffiss was assigned to Bolling Field in Washington, D.C. in 1933. This helped him gain connections to allow him to be posted to Europe in 1935 as an air attache, working in Paris, then Berlin. He was assigned to Spain during the Spanish Civil War, as an observer. Returning to Paris, he was awarded the Légion d'honneur.

Returning to the United States in 1938, he became a student at the Air Corps Tactical School. In 1939 he worked for the Assistant Secretary of War, and then for the War Department Chief of Staff, and in 1940 he was promoted to major.

In 1941, with Europe already at war but before the United States had entered World War II, Griffiss was seconded to London. There he was part of the staff of General James E. Chaney, the team was coordinating U.S. military cooperation with the U.K. in the North Atlantic theater, and organizing the US occupation of Iceland. Ordered to the Soviet Union to discuss planning for US air cargo flights between Alaska and the Russian Far East, Griffiss spent two months in Moscow, before moving to Kuibyshev when advancing Nazi Germany forces threatened to overrun Moscow. In November, he was promoted to lieutenant colonel.

Death
Griffiss died at age 41 in February 1942, on the last leg of his return journey from the Soviet Union, via Tehran and Cairo. The B-24 Liberator bomber in which he was a passenger was mistakenly shot down over the English Channel by Polish fliers in the Royal Air Force (RAF), thus becoming the first American aviator killed in the European Theatre of World War II.

Arriving on an unusual route over occupied Europe, the then-unfamiliar B-24 was mistaken for a four-engine  the intercepting Spitfire pilots were based in Exeter and had not been adequately briefed about the inbound B-24 flight, which ended south of the Eddystone Lighthouse. All nine aboard were never recovered and the incident was a major embarrassment for the Air Ministry.

Griffiss was posthumously awarded the Army's Distinguished Service Medal.  His body was not recovered; there are memorials to him in Buffalo at Forest Lawn Cemetery and in England at the Cambridge American Cemetery and Memorial.

Legacy
Camp Griffiss, a U.S. military base in Bushy Park, London, was named after him. It served as the European Headquarters for the USAAF from July 1942 to December 1944 and was General Dwight Eisenhower's SHAEF headquarters. The USAF had originally named the Fort Worth Army Airfield in Texas as "Griffiss Air Force Base" on January 1, 1948, but it was soon changed on February 27 to memorialize native son and Medal of Honor winner Major Horace Carswell, who gave his life while attempting to crash land his crippled B-24 over China.

Later that year, Rome Air Depot, an Air Corps facility in central New York state at Rome (which opened the month Griffiss died), was renamed Griffiss Air Force Base; USAF aircraft operated from there until 1995, when the base was closed. It is now Griffiss International Airport and Griffiss Business Park, which supports a detachment of the Air Force Research Laboratory.

His great-nephew (sister's grandson) and namesake is Rear Admiral Townsend Griffiss Alexander of the U.S. Navy, who retired from active duty

Notes

References

External links
Strategic-Air-Command.com – Griffiss Air Force Base 
When you go to Hawaii you will need this guide to the Islands, Townsend Griffiss, Houghton Mifflin (Riverside Press, Cambridge MA) 1930. Book text online at HathiTrust Digital Library
Townsend Griffiss, forgotten hero of World War II by Stephen Mulvey, BBC News, 14 February 2012

Military personnel from Buffalo, New York
People from Coronado, California
United States Military Academy alumni
United States Army Air Forces colonels
American people of the Spanish Civil War
United States Army Air Forces pilots of World War II
Recipients of the Distinguished Service Medal (US Army)
Recipients of the Legion of Honour
1900 births
1942 deaths
Burials at Forest Lawn Cemetery (Buffalo)
United States Army Air Forces personnel killed in World War II
Military personnel from California
Military personnel killed by friendly fire
Friendly fire incidents of World War II
20th-century American male writers